Lieutenant John Weston Warner DFC was a British World War I flying ace credited with eight aerial victories.

References

1899 births
1918 deaths
People from Sunderland
Royal Flying Corps officers
British World War I flying aces
Recipients of the Distinguished Flying Cross (United Kingdom)
British military personnel killed in World War I